Noli me tangere ("do not touch me") is the Latin version of words spoken by Jesus to Mary Magdalene.

Noli me tangere may also refer to:
 Noli Me Tangere (Bernini), a sculptural arrangement in the church of Santi Domenico e Sisto, in Rome
 Noli me tangere (Bramantino), a c. 1500 painting
 Noli Me Tángere (novel) (1887), by José Rizal
 Noli Me Tangere (opera) (1957), opera based on Rizal's novel
 Noli Me Tángere (film), a 1961 Philippine period drama film
 Noli me tangere (Titian), painted circa 1514
 Noli me tangere casket, a reliquary of the Aachen Cathedral Treasury, now destroyed
 Noli me tangere (Sustris)
 Noli me tangere (Correggio)